William Youatt (1776 – 5 February 1847) was an English veterinary surgeon and animal welfare writer.

Life
Youatt was the son of a non-conformist minister. He was educated for the nonconformist ministry, and undertook ministerial and scholastic duties in London. He was in Chichester, Sussex by 1803, when he married Mary Payne on 12 December at All Saints Chichester. At some uncertain date, in 1812 or 1813, he joined Delabere Pritchett Blaine (1768–1848) in conducting a veterinary infirmary in Wells Street, Oxford Street. This partnership continued for a little more than twelve years, when the business passed into Youatt's hands.

In 1828 Youatt began to deliver a series of lectures and demonstrations to veterinary students at his private residence and infirmary in Nassau Street. These were independent of, and to some extent designed to supplement, the teaching of the London Veterinary College. From the end of 1830 these lectures were delivered at University College London. In 1835 they were abandoned, but instead Youatt continued for four years to print a monthly series of written lectures in the Veterinarian, a professional monthly which he had started in 1828. In this venture he was soon joined by William Percivall, veterinary surgeon to the 1st life guards. This journal, which was still in existence in 1900, was kept alive in the early years only by Youatt's dogged perseverance, at a time when even his co-editor, Percivall, wished to abandon the venture.

During 1835 Youatt was appointed as the Honorary Veterinarian Surgeon of the Society for the Prevention of Cruelty to Animals (later RSPCA).  He was an entrant in an essay-writing competition in 1837 where a benefactor of the RSPCA offered a prize of one hundred pounds for the best piece;
"The Essay required is one which shall morally illustrate, and religiously enforce, the obligation of man towards the inferior and dependent creatures--their protection and security from abuse, more especially as regards those engaged in service, and for the use and benefit of mankind-on the sin of cruelty--the infliction of wanton or unnecessary pain, taking the subject under its various denominations-exposing the specious defence of vivisection on the ground of its being for the interests of science--the supplying the infinite demands on the poor animal in aid of human speculations by exacting extreme labour, and thereby causing excessive suffering--humanity to the brute as harmonious with the spirit and doctrines of Christianity, and the duty of man as a rational and accountable creature."
Youatt's essay was not selected as the winning entry.  Nevertheless he arranged for the publication of his work which was released as The Obligation and Extent of Humanity to Brutes. Youatt's book prompted an extensive review by William Karkeek in The Veterinarian in 1839 on the subject of animal souls and the afterlife.

In 1838 the Royal Agricultural Society of England had been founded under the title of the English Agricultural Society. Youatt was one of the original members, and was placed on the committee of management. Here he obtained the appointment of a veterinary committee, of which he was appointed chairman, and attempted with considerable success to draw closer the connection between the Society and the Royal Veterinary College.

Owing partly to his extensive literary work, partly to attacks of gout, Youatt's practice had devolved more and more on his assistant, Ainsley, on whose death in 1844 the establishment in Nassau Street was broken up. Youatt, though now standing at the head of his profession, was not a registered member of it; he objected to the constitution of the examining body of the Royal College of Veterinary Surgeons, which consisted chiefly of physicians and surgeons. When, however, in 1844, this body was remodelled, and composed chiefly of veterinarians, Youatt, being then nearly seventy years old, presented himself for examination. The difficulty occasioned by his refusal to answer a professional question rather impertinently put to him was overruled by the chairman, who handed him his diploma on the spot. Youatt's daughter, Elizabeth, was to later marry the organisation's secretary.

Youatt had five daughters, not 4 as reported in  the DNB, who included the novelist Elizabeth Youatt.

Death

The DNB reports that Youatt died on 5 February 1847 in his seventy-first year, and was buried in the churchyard of Old St. Pancras. Newspapers reported that Youatt, suffering from bouts of depression for several years, committed suicide on 9 January 1847. 

Historian James A. Secord has written that Youatt committed suicide by eating a bun containing prussic acid.

Works
In 1830 Youatt entered into an arrangement with the Society for the Diffusion of Useful Knowledge to write a series of handbooks on the breeds, management, and diseases of the different animals of the farm. The volumes continued to appear at irregular intervals during the ensuing ten years. In 1839 a testimonial was presented to Youatt by various members of the veterinary profession as a mark ‘of the high esteem they entertain of his literary labours in veterinary science.’ A full account of the proceedings appeared in the ‘Veterinarian’ (xii. 595–619), and is noteworthy by reason of the long autobiographical speech in which Youatt traced the growth of veterinary literature in his time.

Youatt's works include:
Canine Madness, 1830 (practically a reprint of articles which had been issued in the Veterinarian).
The Horse (with a treatise on draught, by Isambard Kingdom Brunel), 1831; new edit. 1843 (to this work was added in the posthumous editions an appendix by William Charles Spooner, bringing the work up to date).
Cattle, their Breeds, Management, and Diseases, 1834. With this subject Youatt was at the time much less familiar than with the treatment of the diseases of horses, and the veterinary part of the work is to be regarded rather as a well-digested compilation than as an original treatise.

[https://archive.org/details/b29297576/page/n4 The Obligation and Extent of Humanity to Brutes, Principally Considered with Reference to the Domesticated Animals], 1839.
The Dog, 1845. This, like his previous works on the horse, cattle, and sheep, formed part of the Library of Useful Knowledge. It was also reprinted as part of Knight's Farmers' Library, and again in 1852 (.)
The Pig: a Treatise on the Breeds, Management, Feeding, and Medical Treatment of Swine; with Directions for salting Pork and curing Bacon and Hams, 1847; new edit. 1860, enlarged and rewritten by Samuel Sidney. On the title-page of the 1847 edition of this work, which was issued after his death, Youatt is referred to as the editor of the Complete Grazier, and later editions—that of Robert Scott Burn in 1877 and of William Fream in 1893—refer to the work as Youatt's. The book was, however, first compiled in the eighteenth century. The sixth edition (1833) and seventh (1839) are supposed to have been edited by Youatt, though intrinsic evidence for this is lacking.

Youatt also wrote much in the Veterinarian, and made some contributions to the Journal of the Royal Agricultural Society.

Legacy
William Youatt's 1834 book on cattle is noted as an influence on Charles Darwin's work on natural selection soon thereafter, due to Youatt's understanding of artificial selection in animal breeding.  Youatt described the selection of close kin of slaughtered animals with desirable characteristics for future breeding.

References

Attribution

External links
 
 
Works at Open Library

1776 births
1847 deaths
Anti-vivisectionists
British animal welfare scholars
British animal welfare workers
English veterinarians